Durban (Durban in Gascon) is a commune in the Gers department in southwestern France in the Occitanie Region. Historically and culturally, the town is in the country of Astarac, a territory in the very hilly south of Gers, with clay soil, which runs along the Plateau de Lannemezan.

Exposed to an altered oceanic climate, it is drained by the Sousson, the Cédon and various other small rivers. The town has a remarkable natural heritage made up of three natural areas of ​​ecological, faunal and floristic interest.

Durban is a rural municipality with 138 inhabitants en 2019, after experiencing a population peak of 531 inhabitants in 1831. It is located near Auch. Its inhabitants are called Durbannais or Durbannaises.

Geography

Population

See also
Communes of the Gers department

References

Communes of Gers